Spasskoye is a rural locality (a village) in Bereznikovskoye Rural Settlement, Sobinsky District, Vladimir Oblast, Russia. The population was 21 in 2010.

Geography 
The village is located on the Klyazma River, 11 km north-west from Berezniki, 13 km south-west from Sobinka.

References 

Rural localities in Sobinsky District